The 2013 WNBA season is the 14th season for the Seattle Storm of the Women's National Basketball Association.

Transactions

WNBA Draft
The following are the Storm's selections in the 2013 WNBA Draft.

Transaction log
December 14, 2012: Lauren Jackson announces that her hamstring surgery will force her out of the 2013 season.
January 11: The Storm waive Alison Lacey.
February 7: The Storm signs free agents Temeka Johnson and Noelle Quinn, and waives Ann Wauters
February 20: The Storm signs free agent Nakia Sanford 
March 5: The Storm re-signs Alysha Clark.
April 15: The Storm signed 2012 draft pick Keisha Hampton.
April 25: The Storm sign draft picks Tiana Hawkins and Chelsea Poppens.
March 11: The Storm signed Cierra Bravard.
May 4: The Storm waive Chay Shegog.
May 9: Sue Bird undergoes knee surgery, announces that will sit out of 2013 season.
May 12: The Storm waive Alexis Gray-Lawson.
May 13: The Storm waive Jasmine James and Katelan Redmon.
May 19: The Storm waive Keisha Hampton and Samantha MacKay.

Roster

Depth

Season standings

Schedule

Preseason

|- style="background:#cfc;"
		 | 1 
		 | May 12
		 | @ Los Angeles
		 | 
		 | Thompson & Hawkins (8)
		 | Noelle Quinn (7)
		 | Temeka Johnson (5)
		 | Walter Pyramid at Long Beach State1524
		 | 1–0
|- style="background:#cfc;"
		 | 2 
		 | May 17
		 |  Tulsa
		 | 
		 | Tina Thompson (19)
		 | Shekinna Stricklen (10)
		 | Noelle Quinn (4)
		 | Key Arena4347
		 | 2–0

Regular season

|- style="background:#fcc;"
		 | 1 
		 | May 26
		 | @ Los Angeles
		 | 
		 | Camille Little (13)
		 | Quinn, Thompson, Wright, Johnson, Hawkins, & Stricklen (3)
		 | Wright & Johnson (5)
		 | Staples Center10090
		 | 0–1

|- style="background:#cfc;"
		 | 2 
		 | June 2
		 |  Phoenix
		 | 
		 | Tanisha Wright (20)
		 | Tina Thompson (6)
		 | Temeka Johnson (6)
		 | Key Arena9686
		 | 1–1
|- style="background:#fcc;"
		 | 3 
		 | June 7
		 |  Tulsa
		 | 
		 | Tina Thompson (17)
		 | Thompson & Little (5)
		 | Quinn, Wright, & Johnson (2)
		 | Key Arena6879
		 | 1–2
|- style="background:#fcc;"
		 | 4 
		 | June 14
		 | @ Atlanta
		 | 
		 | Thompson & Johnson (11)
		 | Tina Thompson (7)
		 | Tanisha Wright (6)
		 | Philips Arena4960
		 | 1–3
|- style="background:#cfc;"
		 | 5 
		 | June 16
		 | @ Connecticut
		 | 
		 | Tina Thompson (17)
		 | Camille Little (9)
		 | Temeka Johnson (6)
		 | Mohegan Sun Arena6550
		 | 2–3
|- style="background:#cfc;"
		 | 6 
		 | June 18
		 |  Washington
		 | 
		 | Tina Thompson (30)
		 | Tina Thompson (8)
		 | Tanisha Wright (6)
		 | Key Arena4579
		 | 3–3
|- style="background:#cfc;"
		 | 7 
		 | June 21
		 | @ San Antonio
		 | 
		 | Camille Little (23)
		 | Camille Little (10)
		 | Temeka Johnson (7)
		 | AT&T Center7009
		 | 4–3
|- style="background:#fcc;"
		 | 8 
		 | June 22
		 | @ Tulsa
		 | 
		 | Tianna Hawkins (17)
		 | Little, Wright, & Clark (5)
		 | Temeka Johnson (3)
		 | BOK Center4327
		 | 4–4
|- style="background:#fcc;"
		 | 9 
		 | June 28
		 |  NY Liberty
		 | 
		 | Temeka Johnson (22)
		 | Quinn, Little, & Tanisha Wright (5)
		 | Quinn, Wright, Johnson, Stricklen, Hawkins (1)
		 | Key Arena7687
		 | 4–5
|- style="background:#fcc;"
		 | 10 
		 | June 30
		 | @ Indiana
		 | 
		 | Shekinna Stricklen (11)
		 | Camille Little (8)
		 | Wright & Johnson (3)
		 | Bankers Life Fieldhouse6355
		 | 4–6

|- style="background:#cfc;"
		 | 11 
		 | July 2
		 | @ Chicago
		 | 
		 | Little & Johnson (16)
		 | Tina Thompson (11)
		 | Wright & Johnson (5)
		 | Allstate Arena5808
		 | 5–6
|- style="background:#fcc;"
		 | 12 
		 | July 6
		 | @ Washington
		 | 
		 | Shekinna Stricklen (20)
		 | Camille Little (6)
		 | Temeka Johnson (10)
		 | Verizon Center6174
		 | 5–7
|- style="background:#fcc;"
		 | 13 
		 | July 9
		 | @ NY Liberty
		 | 
		 | Tina Thompson (13)
		 | Tina Thompson (7)
		 | Temeka Johnson (5)
		 | Prudential Center5766
		 | 5–8
|- style="background:#cfc;"
		 | 14 
		 | July 14
		 |  Atlanta
		 | 
		 | Tanisha Wright (21)
		 | Camille Little (10)
		 | Temeka Johnson (5)
		 | Key Arena6479
		 | 6–8
|- style="background:#fcc;"
		 | 15 
		 | July 17
		 |  Tulsa
		 | 
		 | Camille Little (11)
		 | Little & Clark (6)
		 | Tanisha Wright (5)
		 | Key Arena9686
		 | 6–9
|- style="background:#fcc;"
		 | 16 
		 | July 20
		 |  Los Angeles
		 | 
		 | Camille Little (22)
		 | Tina Thompson (7)
		 | Temeka Johnson (5)
		 | Key Arena6357
		 | 6–10
|- style="background:#cfc;"
		 | 17 
		 | July 25
		 | @ Los Angeles
		 | 
		 | Tina Thompson (23)
		 | Thompson & Quinn (8)
		 | Temeka Johnson (4)
		 | Staples Center12651
		 | 7–10

|- style="text-align:center;"
| colspan="9" style="background:#bbcaff;"|All-Star Break
|- style="background:#cfc;"
		 | 18 
		 | August 1
		 |  Phoenix
		 | 
		 | Thompson & Johnson (16)
		 | Tina Thompson (7)
		 | Wright & Johnson (7)
		 | Key Arena6457
		 | 8–10
|- style="background:#fcc;"
		 | 19 
		 | August 4
		 | @ Minnesota
		 | 
		 | Shekinna Stricklen (24)
		 | Wright & Quinn (6)
		 | Tanisha Wright (6)
		 | Target Center9032
		 | 8–11
|- style="background:#cfc;"
		 | 20 
		 | August 6
		 | @ Phoenix
		 | 
		 | Thompson & Wright (19)
		 | Tina Thompson (8)
		 | Tina Thompson (4)
		 | US Airways Center6877
		 | 9–11
|- style="background:#fcc;"
		 | 21 
		 | August 9
		 |  San Antonio
		 | 
		 | Shekinna Stricklen (16)
		 | Clark & Quinn (5)
		 | Little, Wright, Johnson, Hawkins, & Quinn (2)
		 | Key Arena5978
		 | 9–12
|- style="background:#cfc;"
		 | 22 
		 | August 11
		 |  San Antonio
		 | 
		 | Tina Thompson (17)
		 | Thompson & Quinn (11)
		 | Temeka Johnson (6)
		 | Key Arena6249
		 | 10–12
|- style="background:#fcc;"
		 | 23 
		 | August 15
		 |  Chicago
		 | 
		 | Tanisha Wright (20)
		 | Tanisha Wright (5)
		 | Temeka Johnson (6)
		 | Key Arena6829
		 | 10–13
|- style="background:#cfc;"
		 | 24 
		 | August 17
		 |  Indiana
		 | 
		 | Tina Thompson (23)
		 | Tina Thompson (7)
		 | Tanisha Wright (8)
		 | Key Arena6889
		 | 11–13
|- style="background:#cfc;"
		 | 25 
		 | August 20
		 |  Los Angeles
		 | 
		 | Temeka Johnson (18)
		 | Tina Thompson (10)
		 | Tanisha Wright (9)
		 | Key Arena6738
		 | 12–13
|- style="background:#cfc;"
		 | 26 
		 | August 23
		 | @ Phoenix
		 | 
		 | Temeka Johnson (23)
		 | Stricklen & Thompson (7)
		 | Little & Johnson (3)
		 | US Airways Center8026
		 | 13–13
|- style="background:#fcc;"
		 | 27 
		 | August 25
		 | @ San Antonio
		 | 
		 | Noelle Quinn (14)
		 | Camille Little (6)
		 | Tanisha Wright (7)
		 | AT&T Center6828
		 | 13–14
|- style="background:#cfc;"
		 | 28 
		 | August 27
		 | @ San Antonio
		 | 
		 | Tina Thompson (27)
		 | Tina Thompson (13)
		 | Tanisha Wright (7)
		 | AT&T Center6097
		 | 14–14
|- style="background:#cfc;"
		 | 29 
		 | August 29
		 |  Connecticut
		 | 
		 | Thompson & Little (18)
		 | Tina Thompson (9)
		 | Temeka Johnson (9)
		 | Key Arena5567
		 | 15–14
|- style="background:#fcc;"
		 | 30 
		 | August 31
		 | @ Minnesota
		 | 
		 | Tina Thompson (18)
		 | Alysha Clark (5)
		 | Tanisha Wright (10)
		 | Target Center9123
		 | 15–15

|- style="background:#fcc;"
		 | 31 
		 | September 7
		 |  Minnesota
		 | 
		 | Tanisha Wright (22)
		 | Tanisha Wright (8)
		 | Tanisha Wright (3)
		 | Key Arena8147
		 | 15–16
|- style="background:#fcc;"
		 | 32 
		 | September 10
		 |  Minnesota
		 | 
		 | Tanisha Wright (14)
		 | Noelle Quinn (8)
		 | Tanisha Wright (5)
		 | Key Arena5486
		 | 15–17
|- style="background:#cfc;"
		 | 33 
		 | September 12
		 | @ Tulsa
		 | 
		 | Shekinna Stricklen (26)
		 | Tina Thompson (10)
		 | Tanisha Wright (6)
		 | BOK Center6513
		 | 16–17
|- style="background:#cfc;"
		 | 34 
		 | September 14
		 |  Tulsa
		 | 
		 | Tina Thompson (22)
		 | Noelle Quinn (10)
		 | Tanisha Wright (8)
		 | Key Arena8978
		 | 17–17

Playoffs

|- style="background:#fcc;"
		 | 1 
		 | September 20
		 | @ Minnesota
		 | 
		 | Temeka Johnson (14)
		 | Tina Thompson (8)
		 | Wright & Johnson (4)
		 | Target Center8832
		 | 0–1
|- style="background:#fcc;"
		 | 2 
		 | September 22
		 |  Minnesota
		 | 
		 | Tanisha Wright (16)
		 | Thompson & Clark (9)
		 | Stricklen, Johnson, & Wright (2)
		 | Tacoma Dome3457
		 | 0–2

Statistics

Regular season

Awards and honors

References

External links

Seattle Storm seasons
Seattle
2013 in sports in Washington (state)
Seattle Storm